The 1926 SMU Mustangs football team was an American football team that represented the Southern Methodist University (SMU) as a member of the Southwest Conference (SWC) during the 1926 college football season. In its seventh season under head coach Ray Morrison, the team compiled an 8–0–1 record and outscored opponents by a total of 229 to 47.

Coach Morrison brought the forward pass to the southwest during his time at SMU, using Gerald Mann as his passer.

Schedule

References

SMU
SMU Mustangs football seasons
Southwest Conference football champion seasons
College football undefeated seasons
SMU Mustangs football